The 1964 Football League Cup Final, the fourth to be staged since the competition's inception, was contested between  Stoke City and Leicester City, both of the First Division, over two legs. Leicester City won 4–3 on aggregate.

Match review

First leg
The First leg was played at Stoke City's Victoria Ground and was a very exciting encounter. Peter Dobing hit the post early on and John Ritchie had a shot brilliantly cleared off the line by John Sjoberg. After a goalless first half Keith Bebbington broke the deadlock putting Stoke ahead after 62 minutes after Bill Asprey's 30 yard shot was parried by the Leicester 'keeper Gordon Banks, but Bebbington was fastest to the loose ball. In front of a crowd of 22,309 Stoke went out for a second goal but Leicester's defence held firm and against the run of play they got an equaliser. A poor clearance from Eric Skeels rebounded off Terry Heath into the path of Dave Gibson who lobbed the ball over Lawrie Leslie and into the unguarded net to set up a winner takes all 2nd leg.

Second leg
For the Second leg at Filbert Street Stoke manager Tony Waddington had to change his goalkeeper with Leslie out with an ankle injury Bobby Irvine taking his place. He was unable to prevent Mike Stringfellow from scoring after six minutes following a defensive error. Stoke hit back and a perfect pass from Jimmy McIlroy cut through the Foxes’ defence and Dennis Viollet levelled the scores. This put Stoke into the ascendency but then a nasty leg injury to Calvin Palmer saw him stretchered off and thus put Stoke down to 10 men. Leicester capitalised on the situation and before Palmer was able to get back on the pitch Gibson headed in a Howard Riley corner. With not long left Stoke pushed forward and left a too big a gap in defence and Dave Gibson made it 3–1. Stoke to their credit fought on and pulled one back through George Kinnell but it was too late as Leicester won the tie 3–2 giving them a 4–3 aggregate win and with it the League Cup.

Players and officials

First Leg

Second Leg

Road to the Final
Home teams listed first.

References

External links
League Cup 1964 at RSSSF

League Cup Final
League Cup Final
EFL Cup Finals
League Cup Final 1964
League Cup Final 1964
Football League Cup Final